Sarah Milkovich is lead of Science Operations for the Mars 2020 rover at Jet Propulsion Laboratory. She was investigation scientist for the HiRISE camera on the Mars Reconnaissance Orbiter.

Education 
Milkovich grew up in Ithaca, New York. Here she became interested in astronomy watching TV specials about spacecraft of Nova and PBS, and during vacations in northern Minnesota. She used to watch the Perseid Meteor Shower with her parents. Milkovich attended Phillips Exeter Academy, which she graduated in 1996. Whilst a high school student, she worked as an intern for the NEAR Shoemaker spacecraft. She earned a bachelor's degree in planetary science at California Institute of Technology in 2000. She moved to Brown University, where she earned a Masters and PhD in planetary geology in 2005.

Career 
Milkovich joined the NASA Jet Propulsion Laboratory after completed her PhD. There she has worked on the Mars Phoenix landing spacecraft, the Cassini–Huygens mission and Mars Reconnaissance Orbiter. Her first rover was Curiosity, for which she was responsible for high-resolution imaging using HiRISE. She was most proud of the Mars Science Laboratory parachute image of Curiosity's landing. HiRISE allowed Milkovich and scientists to take turns to choose where images were taken, and took suggestions from the public. She featured on C-SPAN representing NASA to talk about developments in Curiosity.

Milkovich is the lead Science systems Engineer for Jet Propulsion Laboratory's Mars 2020 rover. The rover is estimated to cost $2 billion.

She regularly appears on online science podcasts and videos. She visits schools and gives public talks to inspire the next generation of scientists and engineers. She has been a keynote speaker at Dragon Con in 2016 and 2018.

References 

American women astronomers
American astrophysicists
California Institute of Technology alumni
Brown University alumni
Scientists from Ithaca, New York
Phillips Exeter Academy alumni
Women astrophysicists
21st-century American astronomers
21st-century American women scientists
Living people
Year of birth missing (living people)
Planetary scientists
Women planetary scientists